Sir Henry North, 2nd Baronet (c.1635 – 5 July 1695) was an English Tory politician.

North was the son of Sir Henry North, 1st Baronet and Sarah Rayney. He was educated at King Edward VI School, Bury St Edmunds and St John's College, Cambridge. On 29 August 1671 he succeeded to his father's baronetcy. Between 1678 and 1688, North was a Deputy Lieutenant of Suffolk. In 1685, he was elected as a Member of Parliament for Suffolk, holding the seat in 1687. He did not seek re-election in 1689 following the Glorious Revolution, and died in 1695 at which point his title became extinct.

References

Year of birth uncertain
1695 deaths
Alumni of St John's College, Cambridge
Baronets in the Baronetage of England
Deputy Lieutenants of Suffolk
English MPs 1685–1687
People educated at King Edward VI School, Bury St Edmunds
Tory MPs (pre-1834)